Martin Spellman IV (October 8, 1925 – May 6, 2020) was an American child actor active in films during the 1930s and 1940s.

Career
Martin Spellman IV was born in 1925 in Des Moines, Iowa. After his family moved to California, at the age of 9 he first entered the MGM studios not as a prospective actor but as a newsboy. 

He became such a familiar figure at MGM that for Christmas 1937, they decided to give him a very special Christmas present. Clark Gable invited him to work as an extra for a few days on the film Test Pilot where he had an uncredited role. After that, he played Skinny in the 1938 film Boys Town, starring Spencer Tracy and Mickey Rooney. In 1939, he co-starred in Streets of New York with Jackie Cooper. The following year he had another leading role in Son of the Navy with Jean Parker and James Dunn. 

Spellman's film career ended in 1941. He then enlisted in the United States Army Air Corps during World War II. Returning to civilian life, he spent 27 years in the business world, and then switched to automobile finance and insurance. 

Spellman died in Vancouver, Washington in May 2020 at the age of 94.

Filmography

References

Bibliography
 Holmstrom, John (1996). The Moving Picture Boy: An International Encyclopaedia from 1895 to 1995. Norwich: Michael Russell, p. 154.

External links
 
 Martin Spellman, in boyactors.org.uk

1925 births
2020 deaths
Male actors from Des Moines, Iowa
Military personnel from Iowa
American male child actors
American male film actors
20th-century American male actors